Brusqeulia guaramiranga is a species of moth of the family Tortricidae. It is found in Brazil.

The wingspan is about 11.5 mm. The ground colour of the forewings is glossy whitish, mixed with brownish cream mainly in the basal and terminal parts of the wing. There is a row of blackish-brown spots along the termen. The markings are grey with black spots. The hindwings are greyish, the basal part of the wing is whiter.

Etymology
The specific name refers to the type locality, Guaramiranga.

References

Moths described in 2011
Brusqeulia
Moths of South America
Taxa named by Józef Razowski